Auburn Township is located in Sangamon County, Illinois. As of the 2010 census, its population was 6,333 and it contained 2,513 housing units.

Geography

Demographics

References

External links
City-data.com
Illinois State Archives

Townships in Sangamon County, Illinois
Springfield metropolitan area, Illinois
Townships in Illinois